"Domino" is a song by English singer and songwriter Jessie J from her debut studio album, Who You Are (2011). The song was released on 29 August 2011 as the fifth single from the album. Musically, "Domino" is an electropop, pop rock, & dance-pop song. Jessie J co-wrote "Domino" with its producers, Dr. Luke and Cirkut, with extra writing from Claude Kelly and Max Martin. Domino was included on the platinum or deluxe edition of "Who You Are" only.

The song became Jessie J's second number-one single in the UK, following her previous collaboration with Dr. Luke and Claude Kelly titled "Price Tag" (2011). In the United States, the song peaked at number 6 on the Billboard Hot 100, become her first top 10 in nation. The song also was nominated for the Brit Award for Best British Single at the 2013 BRIT Awards.

Background and composition

"Domino" was written by Lukasz "Dr. Luke" Gottwald, Claude Kelly, Max Martin, Henry "Cirkut" Walter, and Jessie J herself, while production was helmed by Dr. Luke and Cirkut. In July, 2011, Jessie J teased her fans via her official Twitter profile whilst posting 21-second clip of the song. "Domino" officially premiered on 16 August 2011 on Jessie J's official YouTube account. During an interview with MTV Buzzworthy, Jessie J further explained the concept behind the song, "People have heard 'Domino' and said 'it's nothing like you.' But I'm like well the album's really eclectic anyway, and I never go into the studio and say 'I wanna do another song that's like 'Price Tag' or another song like 'Do It Like a Dude'." In the same interview Jessie J unveiled that she often listened to Whitney Houston and Prince, so she came up with an idea to write a song that is "timeless, fun and uplifting". The song was released as lead single from the platinum edition of Jessie J's debut album Who You Are and fifth overall.

"Domino" has a beat that was described as "funky and disco-like". It is written in the key of G major with a tempo of 127 beats per minute, following the chord progression G5–Gsus4–G–Gsus4.  Jessie's vocals span from D4 to G5.

2012 lawsuit
On 27 June 2012 songwriter Will Loomis sued Jessie J and her record label Universal Music Group for copyright infringement alleging that the melody in "Domino" (2011) was identical to the melody in his song "Bright Red Chords" (2008). Loomis made a mashup of the two songs which Universal attempted to take off YouTube prompting Wikinews to cover the story.  Loomis, on his Facebook page, posted a letter from Jessie J's record label dated 5 May 2010, in which they expressed interest in the song and asked him to send them a copy. In 2016, the lawsuit was dismissed by the 9th U.S. Circuit Court of Appeals because Loomis could not prove the songwriters had access to the song.

Critical reception

While critics praised the vocals on "Domino", they were divided on the heavy production and similarities to Katy Perry's Teenage Dream (2010).

Robert Copsey from Digital Spy gave the song a positive review, giving the single four out of five stars. Copsey wrote that although the song's guitar riff is dangerously similar to Perry's "Last Friday Night (T.G.I.F.)", (2011), "'Domino' is easily [Jessie J]'s glossiest outing since 'Price Tag'". He commended the package of "catchy hooks" and "saucy lines" present throughout the song, likening it to "[heading] out for a night on the tiles." James Masterson of About.com said that "Domino" is an "amazing pop record". Sarah Deen from Metro gave the song a positive review, writing "The beat is funky and disco-like, with Jessie's powerhouse vocals adding that extra punch to a melodic and feel-good song." Amanda Dobbins of New York Magazine commented, "Jessie lands the high notes just fine, and 'Domino' shows off her pure pop abilities, if not her soul, to solid effect." Dobbins called the song a "total jam," reminiscent of Teenage Dream.

Katherine St Asaph from Popdust gave the single three and a half out of five stars, writing that, although it was better than Jessie J's other singles, it was still "completely useless". St Asaph criticised the song as generic, saying "it’s almost impossible to imagine 'Domino' offending someone and just as hard to imagine people disliking it specifically".

Chart performance
In the United Kingdom, "Domino" debuted at number 54 on the UK Singles Chart issued for 31 December 2011. It then registered a 20-position climb to number 34, becoming Jessie J's sixth consecutive top 40 hit in the United Kingdom. On 14 January 2012, "Domino" climbed a further 26 places to number eight with sales of 30,192, becoming Jessie J's fifth top ten hit from Who You Are. The single then rose seven places to replace Flo Rida's "Good Feeling" at the top of the UK Singles Chart, registering Jessie J's second number-one hit in the United Kingdom following "Price Tag" in 2011. It was number-one for two consecutive weeks, selling 64,255 copies and 12.01% more in its second week at number-one. The song has sold 749,000 copies in the UK in 2012, finishing at number 8 on the UK end of year chart.

"Domino" debuted on the ARIA Charts of Australia at number 12, and peaked at number five the following week. It became her third top ten hit and her second highest peaking single. The song stayed on the charts for 22 weeks. It has since been certified triple platinum by the Australian Recording Industry Association (ARIA) for sales of 210,000 units. On 12 September 2011, the single debuted at number three on the New Zealand RIANZ charts, becoming her fourth consecutive top ten hit there. It spent 21 weeks on the chart and was certified platinum by the Recording Industry Association of New Zealand (RIANZ) for sales of 15,000 units. 

In the United States, the song debuted at number 96 on the Billboard Hot 100 chart dated October 29, 2011, where it peaked at number 6 on the chart dated February 18, 2012,  becoming her first top 10 on the chart. The song was certified platinum by the Recording Industry Association of America (RIAA) on February 7, 2012, for sales of 1,000,000 units in the US.

Music video

Live montage version

After the release of the single in August 2011, there were initial plans to film a music video for the song. The concept of the music video would involve Jessie J sitting on a throne surrounded by an army of purple haired dancers whose behavior she conducts. Due to the injury on her foot which prompted her to pull out of Katy Perry's "California Dreams Tour" under doctor's orders in 2011, she was unable to dance in the video. Jessie J remarked by saying: "If I can't dance then why not get fifteen amazing dancers that can?" Another scene would show Jessie J standing and shaking her hips while golden glitter is being thrown at her. It was directed by Emil Nava, who previously directed her video for "Price Tag" and "Nobody's Perfect". However, the music video was never released. Instead, a live montage was uploaded at Jessie J's VEVO channel on 14 October 2011. The video shows scenes of live shows, backstage footage, cover shots, and external performances. It served as a promotional video for a time before the actual music video was released.

Studio version
After recovering from her injury, Jessie J then resumed filming and by 11 November she announced on her official Twitter page that they had finished shooting the video. It eventually premiered on 26 December 2011, and is directed by Ray Kay. Jessie J is the only person in the video.

Live performances 
Jessie J presented the song at the 2011 MTV Video Music Awards where she served as the show's house artist, performing various songs from her debut album and covers of many popular songs during commercial breaks.

She performed the full version of the song on the American version of The X Factor during the week 3 result show on 10 November 2011. It was also performed at Capital FM's Jingle Bell Ball on the Sunday 4 December in The O2. She also performed the song on The Voice of Holland on 16 December 2011. It was later performed on The Jonathan Ross Show and on Let's Dance for Sport Relief. In April 2012, she performed "Domino" on The Voice with Team Christina Aguilera. Critics noted that her performance paled when and performing the track again at the Diamond Jubilee Concert on 4 June 2012. She also performed the song at the 3rd Indonesian Choice Awards on 29 May 2016.

Formats and track listings

Digital download
"Domino" – 3:51

German CD single
"Domino" – 3:51
"Nobody's Perfect" (Netsky Full Vocal Remix) – 4:55

Digital download – remix
 "Domino" (Rick & K-Night vs. Stefano Prada Remix) – 5:36

US Remix EP
 "Domino" – 3:51
 "Price Tag" (Shux Remix) (featuring Devlin) – 3:27
 "Who You Are" (Seamus Haji Remix Radio Edit) – 3:46
 "LaserLight" (featuring David Guetta) – 3:31
 "My Shadow" – 3:29
 "Domino" (Myon And Shane Remix - Extended Mix) – 5:18

US promotional EP
 "Domino" – 3:52
 "Price Tag" (feat. B.o.B) – 3:43
 "Who You Are" – 3:51
 "LaserLight" (featuring David Guetta) – 3:32
 "My Shadow" – 3:20
 "Domino" (Myon And Shane Remix - Extended Mix) – 7:11

Credits and personnel 
Credits adapted from Who You Are album liner notes.

Jessica Cornish – songwriter, backing vocals and lead vocals
Dr. Luke – songwriter, producer, instrumentation, programming and vocal production
Claude Kelly – songwriter and additional vocals
Max Martin – songwriter
Cirkut – songwriter, producer, instrumentation and programming
Serban Ghenea – mixing
Emily Wright – engineering and vocal production
Chris "Tek" O'Ryan – sound engineer
Clint Gibbs – assistant engineering
John Hanes – mix engineer
Phil Seaford – assistant mix engineer
Tom Coyne – mastering

Charts

Weekly charts

Year-end charts

Certifications

Release history

See also
 List of number-one dance singles of 2012 (U.S.)

References

External links 
 
 

2011 singles
2011 songs
Song recordings produced by Dr. Luke
Songs written by Dr. Luke
Jessie J songs
Songs written by Max Martin
Song recordings produced by Cirkut (record producer)
Song recordings produced by Max Martin
Songs written by Claude Kelly
UK Singles Chart number-one singles
Number-one singles in Scotland
Irish Singles Chart number-one singles
Songs written by Jessie J
Music videos directed by Ray Kay
Songs involved in plagiarism controversies
Lava Records singles
Universal Republic Records singles